This is a list of 111 species in Blaste, a genus of common barklice in the family Psocidae.

Blaste species

 Blaste alfineta New, 1972 c g
 Blaste alluaudi (Badonnel, 1935) c g
 Blaste amazonica Garcia Aldrete, 1999 c g
 Blaste angolensis Badonnel, 1955 c g
 Blaste angusta Smithers, Courtenay, 1984 c g
 Blaste angustipennis Mockford, 1996 c g
 Blaste annellus (Banks, N., 1941) c g
 Blaste aptera Broadhead & Alison Richards, 1980 c g
 Blaste arabica New, 1979 c g
 Blaste auricularia Badonnel, 1987 c g
 Blaste bahamensis Mockford, 2012 c g
 Blaste balli (Badonnel, 1945) c g
 Blaste basilewskyi Badonnel, 1976 c g
 Blaste betschi Badonnel, 1976 c g
 Blaste bicuspis Smithers, Courtenay, 1964 c g
 Blaste binotata (Enderlein, 1926) c g
 Blaste bistriata Schmidt, E. R. & Thornton, 1993 c g
 Blaste bridarollii (Navas, 1928) c g
 Blaste capricornuta Mockford, 1974 c g
 Blaste castala Thornton & Lyall, 1978 c g
 Blaste caudata Mockford, 1991 c g
 Blaste cinerea (Enderlein, 1903) c g
 Blaste cockerelli (Banks, 1904) i c g
 Blaste conspurcata (Rambur, 1842) c g
 Blaste cornuta Badonnel, 1987 c g
 Blaste cyclota Li, Fasheng, 2002 c g
 Blaste cyprica Lienhard, 1995 c g
 Blaste didyma Lienhard, 1986 c g
 Blaste dundoensis Badonnel, 1955 c g
 Blaste edwardi Lienhard & Courtenay Smithers, 2002 c g
 Blaste euryphylla Li, Fasheng & Chikun Yang, 1987 c g
 Blaste falcifer (Smithers, Courtenay, 1979) c g
 Blaste falsa Badonnel, 1976 c g
 Blaste fasciata Mockford, 1974 c g
 Blaste forcepata (New, 1972) c g
 Blaste forficula Schmidt, E. R. & Thornton, 1993 c g
 Blaste furcilla (New, 1974) c g
 Blaste fuscoptera New, 1975 c g
 Blaste fusimera New & Thornton, 1975 c g
 Blaste garciorum Mockford, 1984 i c g b
 Blaste hamata Mockford, 1991 c g
 Blaste harpophylla Li, Fasheng, 2002 c g
 Blaste immobilis Mockford, 1974 c g
 Blaste jambiense Endang & New, 2010 c g
 Blaste lignicola (Enderlein, 1906) c g
 Blaste ligula New & Thornton, 1975 c g
 Blaste longicauda Mockford, 1974 c g
 Blaste longipennis (Banks, 1918) i c g b
 Blaste longispina Mockford, 1991 c g
 Blaste longivalva New, 1975 c g
 Blaste lunulata (New, 1974) c
 Blaste lusambaensis Badonnel, 1973 c g
 Blaste lyriphallus New, 1973 c g
 Blaste machadoi Badonnel, 1955 c g
 Blaste macrops (Smithers, Courtenay, 1984) c g
 Blaste macrura New, 1972 c g
 Blaste magnifica Smithers, Courtenay, 1984 c g
 Blaste martini (Navas, 1922) c g
 Blaste medleri New, 1975 c g
 Blaste membranosa Lienhard & Halperin, 1988 c g
 Blaste memorialis (Banks, N., 1920) c g
 Blaste monserrati Baz, 1990 c g
 Blaste muhni (Navas, 1928) c g
 Blaste nairobensis New, 1975 c g
 Blaste nana New, 1975 c g
 Blaste neotenica Mockford, 1996 c g
 Blaste nubeculosa (Navás, 1932) c g
 Blaste nubilistigma Mockford, 1996 c g
 Blaste obscura (New, 1972) c g
 Blaste obtusa (Hagen, 1858) c g
 Blaste octofaria Li, Fasheng, 2002 c g
 Blaste opposita (Banks, 1907) i c g b
 Blaste oregona (Banks, 1900) i c g b
 Blaste osceola Mockford, 1984 i c g b
 Blaste osella Lienhard, 1987 c g
 Blaste pallida Mockford, 1996 c g
 Blaste panops (Smithers, Courtenay, 1979) c g
 Blaste pauliani (Badonnel, 1943) c g
 Blaste peringueyi (Enderlein, 1925) c g
 Blaste persimilis (Banks, 1908) i c g b
 Blaste phrynae Li, Fasheng, 2002 c g
 Blaste plaumanni New, 1978 c g
 Blaste polioptera Smithers, Courtenay, 1964 c g
 Blaste posticata (Banks, 1905) i c g b
 Blaste pseudozonata (Williner, 1945) c g
 Blaste pusilla Mockford, 1984 c g
 Blaste quadrimaculata (Latreille, 1794) c g
 Blaste quieta (Hagen, 1861) i c g b
 Blaste richardsi New, 1972 c g
 Blaste rotundata (Navas, 1918) c g
 Blaste sarda Lienhard, 1986 c g
 Blaste serrata New, 1973 c g
 Blaste similis Broadhead & Alison Richards, 1980 c g
 Blaste simillima (Enderlein, 1925) c g
 Blaste smilivirgata Li, Fasheng, 1989 c g
 Blaste squarrosa New & Thornton, 1975 c g
 Blaste stuckenbergi Smithers, Courtenay, 1964 c g
 Blaste subapterous (Chapman, 1930) i c g
 Blaste subquieta (Chapman, 1930) i c g b
 Blaste suffusa Broadhead & Alison Richards, 1980 c g
 Blaste taylori New, 1974 c g
 Blaste tillyardi (Smithers, Courtenay, 1969) c g
 Blaste togoensis Turner, B. D. & Cheke, 1983 c g
 Blaste triangularum Badonnel, 1955 c g
 Blaste ukingana (Enderlein, 1902) c g
 Blaste vadoni Badonnel, 1967 c g
 Blaste verticalis Li, Fasheng, 2002 c g
 Blaste viettei Badonnel, 1969 c g
 Blaste vilhenai Badonnel, 1955 c g
 Blaste virgata Broadhead & Alison Richards, 1980 c g
 Blaste yigongensis Li, Fasheng & Chikun Yang, 1987 c g

Data sources: i = ITIS, c = Catalogue of Life, g = GBIF, b = Bugguide.net

References

Blaste
Articles created by Qbugbot